Ayin (also ayn or ain; transliterated  ) is the sixteenth letter of the Semitic scripts, including Phoenician  , Hebrew   , Aramaic  , Syriac   ܥ, and Arabic   (where it is sixteenth in abjadi order only).

The letter represents a voiced pharyngeal fricative or a similarly articulated consonant. In some Semitic languages and dialects, the phonetic value of the letter has changed, or the phoneme has been lost altogether (thus, in the revived Modern Hebrew it is reduced to a glottal stop or is omitted entirely in part due to European influence).

The Phoenician letter is the origin of the Greek, Latin and Cyrillic letter O, O and O.

It is the origin of letter Ƹ.

Origins
The letter name is derived from Proto-Semitic  "eye", and the Phoenician letter had the shape of a circle or oval, clearly representing an eye, perhaps ultimately (via Proto-Sinaitic) derived from the ı͗r hieroglyph  (Gardiner D4).

The Phoenician letter gave rise to the Greek Ο, Latin O, and Cyrillic О, all representing vowels.

The sound represented by ayin is common to much of the Afroasiatic language family, such as in the Egyptian language, the Cushitic languages and the Semitic languages.

Transliteration

In Semitic philology, there is a long-standing tradition of  rendering Semitic ayin with the Greek rough breathing mark  (e.g.   Arabs).
Depending on typography, this could look similar to  either an articulate  single opening quotation mark  (e.g.  ).
or as a raised semi-circle open to the right  (e.g.  ).

This is by analogy to the transliteration of alef (glottal stop, hamza) by the Greek smooth breathing mark , rendered as  single closing quotation mark or as  raised semi-circle open to the left. This convention has been adopted by DIN in 1982 and by ISO in 1984 for Arabic (DIN 31635, ISO 233)  and Hebrew (DIN 31636, ISO 259).

The shape of the "raised semi-circle" for ayin  and alef  was adopted by the  Encyclopedia of Islam (edited  1913–1938, 1954–2005, and from 2007), and from there by the International Journal of Middle East Studies.
This convention has since also been followed by  ISO (ISO 233-2 and ISO 259-2, 1993/4) and by DIN.
A notable exception remains, ALA-LC (1991), the system used by the Library of Congress, continues to recommend  modifier letter turned comma  (for Hebrew) or left single quotation mark  (for Arabic).

In anglicized Arabic or Hebrew names or in loanwords, ayin is often omitted entirely: Iraq   , Arab     ,  Saudi   , etc.; 
Afula ,  Arad ,  etc.

It is usually unvocalized in speech.
The Somali Latin alphabet represents the ayin with the letter .
The informal way to represent it in Arabic chat alphabet uses the digit  as transliteration.

Unicode 

This convention has been adopted by ISO 233-2 (1993) for Arabic and ISO 259-2 (1994) for Hebrew.

There are a number of alternative Unicode characters in use, some of which are easily confused or even considered equivalent in practice:
 , the character used to represent Greek rough breathing,
 ,
 ,
 ,
 , from its use as single opening quotation mark in ASCII environments, used for ayin in ArabTeX.
Other variants chosen to represent ayin as a full grapheme (rather than a sign suggestive of an apostrophe or a diacritic):
 a superscript "c" (c or ),
 the IPA symbol for pharyngealization ( or ) or ʕ, a superscript , the IPA symbol for voiced pharyngeal fricative,

It is worth noting that the phonemes corresponding to alef and ayin in Ancient Egyptian are by convention 
transliterated by more distinctive signs: Egyptian alef is rendered by two semi-circles open to the left, stacked vertically, 
and Egyptian ayin is rendered by a single full-width semi-circle open to the right.

Hebrew ayin

Hebrew spelling: 

ʿayin, along with Aleph, Resh, He and Heth, cannot receive a dagesh.

Phonetic representation
ʿayin has traditionally been described as a voiced pharyngeal fricative. However, this may be imprecise. Although a pharyngeal fricative has occasionally been observed for ʿayin in Arabic and so may occur in Hebrew as well, the sound is more commonly epiglottal, and may also be a pharyngealized glottal stop.

In some historical Sephardi and Ashkenazi pronunciations, ʿayin represented a velar nasal.
In Israeli Hebrew (except for Mizrahi pronunciations), it represents a glottal stop in certain cases but is usually silent (it behaves the same as aleph). However, changes in adjoining vowels often testify to the former presence of a pharyngeal or epiglottal articulation. Additionally, it may be used as a shibboleth to identify the ethnolinguistic background of a Hebrew-speaker, as most Israeli Arab non-Jews and some of Israel's Mizrahi Jews (mainly Yemenite Jews) use the more traditional pronunciation, while other Hebrew-speakers pronounce it similar to Aleph.

Ayin is also one of the three letters that can take a furtive patach.

Gomorrah is from the original  (modern ʿAmora) and Gaza from the original  (ʿaza) (cf. Arabic غزة Ġazzah, IPA: [ˈɣazza].)

In Yiddish, the ʿayin is used to write the vowel e when it is not part of the diphthong ey.

Significance 

In gematria, ʿayin represents the number 70.

ʿayin is also one of the seven letters which receive special crowns (called tagin) when written in a sefer Torah.

Arabic ʿayn

The Arabic letter  (called  ) is the eighteenth letter of the alphabet. It is written in one of several ways depending on its position in the word:

Pronunciation
Arabic ʿayn is one of the most common letters in Arabic. Depending on the region, it ranges from a pharyngeal  to an epiglottal . It is voiced, its voiceless counterpart being .

When pointing was developed, the sound  was distinguished with a dot on top, to give the letter ghayn. In Maltese, which is written with the Latin alphabet, the digraph għ, called ʿajn, is used to write what was originally the same sound.

It is typically represented with a 3 in the Arabic chat alphabet.

Character encodings

See also
Transliteration of Ancient Egyptian

Notes

References

External links 
 

Phoenician alphabet
Arabic letters
Hebrew letters